The 2012–13 Youngstown State Penguins men's basketball team represented Youngstown State University during the 2012–13 NCAA Division I men's basketball season. The Penguins, led by eighth year head coach Jerry Slocum, played their home games at the Beeghly Center and were members of the Horizon League. They finished the season 18–16, 7–9 in Horizon League play to finish in a tie for sixth place. They lost in the quarterfinals of the Horizon League tournament to Wright State. They were invited to the 2013 CIT, the programs first ever Division I postseason tournament appearance, where they defeated Oakland in the first round before losing in the second round to Canisius in overtime.

Roster

Schedule

|-
!colspan=9| Regular season

|-
!colspan=9|Horizon League tournament

|-
!colspan=9| 2013 CIT

Youngstown State Penguins men's basketball seasons
Youngstown
Youngstown
2012 in sports in Ohio
2013 in sports in Ohio